The  (INEHRM) is a research institute of the Mexican Secretariat of Public Education, dedicated to studying the Mexican Revolution (1910–1920).

Pedro Salmerón Sanginés, director-general of the Institute from 2013, resigned on September 21, 2019, citing right-wing opposition. He has been replaced by Felipe Arturo Ávila Espinosa, who has a bachelor's degree in sociology from the Universidad Nacional Autónoma de México and a doctorate in history from the Colegio de México.

References

External links
 
 Books by Instituto Nacional de Estudios Historicos de la Revolucion Mexicana at BookFinder.com

Government of Mexico
History of Mexico
Mexican Revolution